Hoplocryptanthus schwackeanus is a species of flowering plant in the family Bromeliaceae, endemic to Brazil (the states of Minas Gerais and São Paulo). It was first described by Carl Christian Mez in 1891 as Cryptanthus schwackeanus.

References

Bromelioideae
Flora of Brazil
Plants described in 1891